Thenaria is an infraorder of cnidarian anthozoans of the suborder Nyantheae, order Actiniaria.

External links

Actiniaria
Taxa named by Oskar Carlgren
Animal infraorders